Bob Burns may refer to:
Bob Burns (actor) (1884–1957) in The Lonely Trail
Bob Burns (American football coach) (1921–2000), American football player and coach
Bob Burns (Arizona politician) (born 1938), Member of the Arizona Corporation Commission
Bob Burns (drummer) (1950–2015), original drummer in Lynyrd Skynyrd
Bob Burns (footballer) (1884–?), Australian rules footballer for Collingwood
Bob Burns (golfer) (born 1968), American PGA Tour and Nationwide Tour professional golfer
Bob Burns (humorist) (1890–1956), American radio and film comedian of the 1930s and 1940s
Bob Burns (Missouri politician) (born 1948), American politician and member of the Missouri House of Representatives
Bob Burns (running back) (born 1952), former American football running back
Bob Burns III (born 1935), American actor and archivist

See also
Bobby Burns (disambiguation)
Robert Burns (disambiguation)
Burns (surname)